Bradford James Myers (born February 14, 1929) is a former American football halfback who played for the Los Angeles Rams and Philadelphia Eagles. He played college football at Bucknell University, having previously attended Mercersburg Academy.

References

1929 births
Living people
American football running backs
Bucknell Bison football players
Los Angeles Rams players
Philadelphia Eagles players
Players of American football from Pennsylvania
Sportspeople from Lancaster, Pennsylvania